State Route 18 (SR 18) is a primary state highway in the U.S. state of Virginia.  Known for most of its length as Potts Creek Road, the state highway runs  from SR 311 in Paint Bank north to U.S. Route 60 (US 60) and US 220 in Covington.

Route description

SR 18 begins at an intersection with SR 311 (Paint Bank Road) in the community of Paint Bank in Craig County.  The state highway heads northeast as Potts Creek Road through the valley of Potts Creek, which was formerly known as Carpenter Creek.  The Potts Creek valley is bookended by Potts Mountain to the east and Peters Mountain to the west; the latter mountain forms part of the Virginia – West Virginia state line.  SR 18 enters Alleghany County and passes through the hamlets of Potts Creek, Jordan Mines, and Boiling Spring.  At the state highway's final crossing of Potts Creek just south of its confluence with the Jackson River, the highway enters the city of Covington and becomes Indian Valley Road.  At its intersection with Pitzer Ridge Road at the former site of Fort Carpenter, SR 18 becomes Carpenter Drive and crosses the Jackson River.  The state highway crosses over CSX's Alleghany Subdivision.  SR 18 parallels the railroad tracks north under Interstate 64 to its northern terminus at Madison Street, which carries US 60 and US 220, south of downtown Covington.

Major intersections

References

External links

Virginia Highways Project: VA 18

018
State Route 018
State Route 018
State Route 018